Harlem is an American comedy television series created and executive produced by Tracy Oliver. It premiered on Amazon Prime Video on December 3, 2021. In February 2022, the series was renewed for a second season, which premiered on February 3, 2023.

Synopsis
The 10-episode series follows four girlfriends who met while attending New York University and are now in their thirties, living in Harlem, as they try to balance love, life, and their careers as working professionals.

Cast

Main cast 
 Meagan Good as Camille Parks
 Grace Byers as Quinn Joseph
 Shoniqua Shandai as Angie Wilson
 Jerrie Johnson as Tye Reynolds
 Tyler Lepley as Ian Walker

Recurring cast 
 Whoopi Goldberg as Dr. Elise Pruitt
 Jasmine Guy as Patricia Joseph
 Bevy Smith as Aunt Tammy 
 Juani Feliz as Isabela Benitez-Santiago
 Jonathan Burke as Eric 
 Kadeem Ali Harris as Brandon
 Sullivan Jones as Jameson Royce
 Andrea Martin as Robin Goodman (season 1)
 Robert Ri'chard as Shawn (season 1)
 Kate Rockwell as Anna Sharp (season 2)
 Luke Forbes as Michael (season 2)
 Joie Lee as Deborah Parks (season 2)
 Rachel True as Aimee (season 2)
 Trai Byers as Keith (season 2)

Guest Appearances 
 Rick Fox as Phil Joseph (season 2)
 Sherri Shepherd as Sonya Wilson (season 2)
 Lil Rel Howery as Freddie Wilson (season 2)
 Countess Vaughn as Herself (season 2)
 D. Woods as Karla (season 2)

Production
The project was first announced on July 8, 2019, as an untitled half-hour comedy series. Filming was delayed due to the COVID-19 pandemic. Creator Tracy Oliver said she had the idea for the show because she felt there weren't a lot of "Black female friendship stories on the air," and she wanted to portray people in their thirties who were still searching for their path in life. She based the show in part on her own experiences. The series is executive produced by Oliver, Amy Poehler, Kim Lessing, Dave Becky, Pharrell Williams, and Mimi Valdés.

On January 14, 2020, it was announced that Meagan Good, Grace Byers, Jerrie Johnson, and Shoniqua Shandai had been cast in the series, and that Malcolm D. Lee would direct the first two episodes. On February 17, 2021, it was announced that Whoopi Goldberg and Jasmine Guy would be joining the show in recurring roles. On March 4, 2021, it was announced that Andrea Martin, Robert Ri'chard, Juani Feliz, Kate Rockwell, and Sullivan Jones would also have recurring roles. On February 17, 2022, Amazon renewed the series for a second season.

Episodes

Series Overview

Season 1 (2021)

Season 2 (2023)

Release
The trailer was released on November 3, 2021. All 10 episodes of the series premiered on Prime Video on December 3, 2021.

Reception
According to the review aggregation website Rotten Tomatoes, the series' first season has a 95% approval rating based on 22 critics' reviews, with an average rating of 7/10. The website's critics consensus reads: "Harlem is a delight that is often wise about friendly foibles, aided by a terrific cast whose snappy repartee immediately shines." Metacritic assigned the first season a weighted average score of 77 out of 100 based on 12 reviews, indicating "generally favorable reviews".

Accolades

References

External links 
 

2020s American black television series
2020s American LGBT-related comedy television series
Amazon Prime Video original programming
2020s American comedy television series
2021 American television series debuts
Harlem in fiction
Television shows set in Manhattan
English-language television shows
Television series by Amazon Studios
Television series by 3 Arts Entertainment
Television series by Paper Kite Productions
Television series by Universal Television
Television productions postponed due to the COVID-19 pandemic